Neopectinimura devosi is a moth in the family Lecithoceridae. It is found in Papua New Guinea.

References

Moths described in 2014
devosi